Scott Albert may refer to:

Scott Albert (musician), electronic rock musician known as Klayton
Scott Albert (ice hockey), participated in 1989 Memorial Cup

See also